God Module is an American dark electronic band founded in 1999 from Orlando, Florida. Since 2006 they have been based out of Washington state. God Module is currently signed to Metropolis Records.

History
God Module was formed in 1999 by Jasyn Bangert and Andrew Ramirez. The band name was derived from an episode of The X-Files that dramatized a theory about a part of the human brain rumored to be responsible for mankind's belief in religion and the concept of God. The band's first album, Artificial, was released by Inception Records in 2000.

God Module has toured the US and North America frequently, touring almost yearly in the States since 2010, and have played festivals and short tours in Europe.

In 2017, Bangert and Andrew Pearson along with Patrick Hogan of Voicecoil recorded music under the name Hexheart. Hexheart released an album, Midnight On A Moonless Night, and the accompanying single for "A Thousand Times" on Metropolis Records.

Members

Current
 Jasyn Bangert - lead vocals, programming, lyrics 
 Andrew Pearson - synths, backing vocals

Former
Clint Carney (Live synths,  guest vocals Séance and False Face records)
Courtney Bangert (Live synths 2003 - present randomly. Guest vocals on Artificial, Empath, Viscera, Let's Go Dark, Séance, Prophecy and The Unsound records)
Jon Siren (Live drums on the Triptych and Séance tours)
Brill (Live synths 2014 -present randomly)
Byron C Miller (Live vocals and synths 2003 - 2010. Guest Vocals on Empath, Let's Go Dark and The Magic In My Heart is Dead EP)
Andrew Ramirez (Band and live member 1999-2002. Appears on Artificial CD and Perception EP)

Discography
 Artificial (1999) – #11 CMJ RPM Charts
 Perception (EP) (2002)
 Empath (2003)
 Artificial 2.0  (2004)
 Victims Among Friends (EP) (2004)
 Viscera (2005) 
 Let's Go Dark (2007)
 The Magic In My Heart Is Dead (2010)
 Rituals (EP) (2011)
 Séance (2011)
 Doppelganger (EP) (2012)
 Empath 2.0 (2013)
 Psychic Surgery: The Victims Among Friends and Perception EPs (2013)
 False Face (2014)
 Prophecy (2015)
 Unconscious (EP) (2019)
 Cross My Heart (EP) (2019)
 Unsound (Single) (2019)
 The Unsound (2019)
 The Unsound Remixes (2020)

References

External links

 
 

1999 establishments in Florida
American industrial music groups
Electronic music groups from Florida
Electronic music groups from Washington (state)
Metropolis Records artists
American musical duos